William Lawrence Cofield (September 21, 1939 – June 20, 1983) was an American basketball coach. He was the first African-American head coach of a major sport in the Big Ten Conference when he was hired by the University of Wisconsin–Madison in 1976.

Background
Cofield was born and raised in Carrier Mills, Illinois. He played college basketball at Casper Junior College in Casper, Wyoming and at McKendree University in Lebanon, Illinois, where he earned a Bachelor of Arts degree in physical education in 1963. He received a master's degree in physical education from the University of Kentucky in 1967.

Career
Cofield's first coaching assignment was at H. E. Davis Junior High School in Cleveland, Ohio in 1963.  After two years he was named to coach East Technical High School in Cleveland, as an assistant coach where the team went 20–1 in 1965–66.

Cofield's first year of collegiate coaching came at Kentucky State University, where he spent one year as an assistant before being named to head the Lincoln University of Pennsylvania team.  His two-year record of 38–12 included two conference championships and NAIA playoff berths.

Cofield moved to Prairie View A&M University in Prairie View, Texas, where he posted a 57–48 record over four years. His 1972–73 squad went 19–8, placing second in the Southwestern Athletic Conference.

Cofield became the nation's first black athletic director and head coach at a predominantly white institution of higher learning by accepting both positions at the College of Racine in 1973. There, Cofield hired Bo Ryan as his assistant coach. Following a 14–15 season, the school closed. Cofield joined the University of Virginia staff, where he served as an assistant under head coach Terry Holland for two seasons prior to accepting the Wisconsin job.

Cofield coached at Wisconsin for six seasons. His best team was his 1979–80 team, which posted a record of 15–14 and had future NBA players Wes Matthews and Claude Gregory on its roster.

Cofield is a member of the McKendree University Sports Hall of Fame. He died at age 43 from cancer in Madison, Wisconsin in 1983. He is buried at the Sunset Lawn Cemetery in Harrisburg, Illinois.

Head coaching record

College

References

1939 births
1983 deaths
Basketball coaches from Illinois
Basketball players from Illinois
College men's basketball head coaches in the United States
Dominican College of Racine faculty
Casper Thunderbirds men's basketball players
Lincoln Lions men's basketball coaches
McKendree Bearcats men's basketball players
People from Saline County, Illinois
Prairie View A&M Panthers basketball coaches
University of Kentucky alumni
Wisconsin Badgers men's basketball coaches
American men's basketball players